The Unbreakables  (Los irrompibles) is a 1975 Argentine western film.

Plot
Harry "El Caliente" and Billy "El Frío" (Jorge Martínez and Ricardo Espalter) are two successful detectives, hired directly from the United States to solve a series of gold robberies from coaches owned by the Argentine Gold Mining Company. They are "Spaghetti Western" type cowboys, who are helped by four mysterious riders dressed in white overcoats and white hats (played by Enrique Almada, Eduardo D'Angelo, Andrés Redondo and Berugo Carámbula). The four riders always appear just to help the two detectives, in the role of "guardian angels".

Cast
 Jorge Martínez as Harry "El Caliente"
 Ricardo Espalter as Billy "El Frío"
 Graciela Alfano
 Roberto Escalada
 Rolando Dumas
 Santiago Gómez Cou
 Betiana Blum
 Enrique Almada
 Eduardo D'Angelo
 Berugo Carámbula
 Andrés Redondo

External links
 

1975 films
1970s Spanish-language films
Argentine Western (genre) films
1975 Western (genre) films
1970s Argentine films
Films directed by Emilio Vieyra